Eram Garden (Bāgh-e Eram) is a historic Persian garden in Shiraz, Iran.  The garden, and the building within it, are located at the northern shore of the Khoshk River in the Fars province.

History
It is unclear when construction of the gardens began, however historical evidence suggests that the gardens were built during the Seljuk Empire (11th-14th centuries) under the rule of Ahmad Sanjar.

Today, Eram Garden and building are within Shiraz Botanical Garden of Shiraz University. They are open to the public as a historic landscape garden. They are World Heritage Site, and protected by Iran's Cultural Heritage Organization.

Gallery

See also
Persian gardens
Iranian architecture
Qavam House

Sources

External links

 https://web.archive.org/web/20140922071450/http://www.eramgarden.org/
 https://web.archive.org/web/20131219025742/http://eramgarden.shirazu.ac.ir/
 Iran Tourism Center: Eram garden

Persian gardens in Iran
Museums in Iran
Buildings and structures in Shiraz
World Heritage Sites in Iran
Tourist attractions in Shiraz
Botanical gardens in Iran